Christopher Michael Robins (born 2 January 1954) is a British former motorcycle speedway rider.

Born in Newton Abbott, Devon, Robins was a boxer as a schoolboy, and competed in the English Schoolboy Championships. He took up speedway in late 1974, gaining his early experience riding on a beach near Barnstaple, and after riding in second half heats at Exeter, rode for Weymouth Wizards in the National League in 1975, averaging over five points in his first season. In 1976 he averaged over seven for Weymouth which led to a transfer in 1977 to British League Leicester Lions, also riding in the National League on loan to Newport Dragons. He moved on to Workington Comets and then Furness Flyers in 1978 before riding for Milton Keynes Knights. He retired in 1980 after only one match for the Knights.

References

1954 births
Living people
British speedway riders
English motorcycle racers
People from Newton Abbot
Weymouth Wildcats riders
Leicester Lions riders
Milton Keynes Knights riders
Crewe Kings riders
Newport Wasps riders
Swindon Robins riders
Exeter Falcons riders
Workington Comets riders